This is a following list of the MTV Movie Award winners and nominees for Best Cameo. It was first introduced in 2001. After an absence of ten years, the award returned in 2014.

References

MTV Movie & TV Awards